Kraljevac  may refer to:

 Kraljevac, Bjelovar-Bilogora County, a village near Rovišće, Croatia
 Kraljevac, Koprivnica-Križevci County, a village near Križevci, Croatia
 Kraljevac, Lika-Senj County, a village near Senj, Croatia
 Kraljevac, Split-Dalmatia County, a village near Okrug, Croatia
 Kraljevac, Brod-Posavina County, a village near Bukovlje, Croatia
 Kraljevac, Serbia, a special nature reserve near Kovin, Serbia

See also
 Kraljevec (disambiguation)
 Kraljevci (disambiguation)